OpenCart is an online store management system. It is PHP-based, using a MySQL database and HTML components. Support is provided for different languages and currencies. It is freely available under the GNU General Public License. As of May 2016, 342,000 websites were using OpenCart.

History 
OpenCart was  originally developed in 1998 by Christopher G. Mann for Walnut Creek CDROM and later The FreeBSD Mall. The first public release was on May 11, 1999. Developed in Perl, the project saw little activity, and progress stalled in 2000, with Mann posting a message on April 11 stating "other commitments are keeping me from OpenCart development".

The domain expired in February 2005 before being revived by Daniel Kerr, a UK-based developer, who used it as the basis for his own e-commerce software, written in PHP. The first stable release was version 1.1.1, released onto Google Code on 10 February 2009.

In September 2014, Kerr claimed that OpenCart was the number one e-commerce software supplier in China  while in August 2015 it was recorded as responsible for 6.42% of the global e-commerce volumes recorded by builtwith.com, behind WooCommerce and Magento and ahead of OSCommerce, ZenCart and Shopify. In February 2017, he stated that OpenCart  had about 317,000 live OpenCart sites, which was, according to Kerr, more than Shopify or Magento.

Version 2.0 of the software was released in October 2014, featuring an extensive update of the interface.

Version 2.2.0.0 of the software was released in March 2016, after months of testing from OpenCart users.

Version 3.0.3.7 of the software was released in Feb 2021, in collaboration with Webkul. 

Version 4.0.0.0 of the software was released on 24 May 2022

Features

Anti-Fraud 
OpenCart uses fraud management services such as FraudLabs, ClearSale and Global Payments to review customer orders.

Payments 
The OpenCart package offers a variety of payment methods, from bank transfers to online payment gateways. The available core payment methods in an OpenCart installation are as follows: 2Checkout, Authorize.Net, Amazon Payments, Bank Transfer, Cash On Delivery, Klarna, PayPal, Skrill, SagePay and many more.

Publications

See also

 Comparison of shopping cart software
 List of online payment service providers

References

External links
 
 

Free e-commerce software
Free software programmed in PHP